Jorge Piacentini (20 September 1920 – 25 October 1995) was an Argentine sailor. He competed in the Star event at the 1948 Summer Olympics.

References

External links
 

1920 births
1995 deaths
Argentine male sailors (sport)
Olympic sailors of Argentina
Sailors at the 1948 Summer Olympics – Star
Sportspeople from Buenos Aires